A model is an informative representation of an object, person or system. The term originally denoted the plans of a building in late 16th-century English, and derived via French and Italian ultimately from Latin modulus, a measure. 

Models can be divided into physical models (e.g. a model plane) and abstract models (e.g. mathematical expressions describing behavioural patterns). Abstract or conceptual models are central to philosophy of science, as almost every scientific theory effectively embeds some kind of model of the physical or human sphere. 

In commerce, "model" can refer to a specific design of a product as displayed in a catalogue or show room (e.g. Ford Model T), and by extension to the sold product itself.

Types of models include:

Physical model

A physical model (most commonly referred to simply as a model but in this context distinguished from a conceptual model) is a smaller or larger physical copy of an object. The object being modelled may be small (for example, an atom) or large (for example, the Solar System). In some sense, a physical model "is always the reification of some conceptual model; the conceptual model is conceived ahead as the blueprint of the physical one", which is then constructed as conceived.

The geometry of the model and the object it represents are often similar in the sense that one is a rescaling of the other; in such cases, the scale is an important characteristic. However, in many cases the similarity is only approximate or even intentionally distorted. Sometimes the distortion is systematic (e.g., a fixed scale horizontally and a larger fixed scale vertically when modelling topography of a large area, as opposed to a model of a smaller mountain region, which may well use the same scale horizontally and vertically, showing the true slopes).

Physical models allow visualization, from examining the model, of information about the thing the model represents.  A model can be a physical object such as an architectural model of a building. Uses of an architectural model include visualization of internal relationships within the structure or external relationships of the structure to the environment.  Other uses of models in this sense are as toys.

Instrumented physical models are an effective way of investigating fluid flows for Engineering design.  Physical models are often coupled with Computational Fluid Dynamics models to optimize the design of equipment and processes.  This includes external flow such as around buildings, vehicles, people, or hydraulic structures. Wind Tunnel and Water Tunnel testing is often used for these design efforts.  Instrumented physical models can also examine internal flows, for the design of ductwork systems, pollution control equipment, food processing machines, and mixing vessels.  Transparent flow models are used in this case to observe the detailed flow phenomenon. These models are scaled in terms of both geometry and important forces, for example, using Froude number or Reynolds number scaling (see Similitude).

A physical model of something large is usually smaller, and of something very small is larger. A physical model of something that can move, like a vehicle or machine, may be completely static, or have parts that can be moved manually, or be powered. A physical model may show inner parts that are normally not visible. The purpose of a physical model on a smaller scale may be to have a better overview, for testing purposes, as hobby or toy. The purpose of a physical model on a larger scale may be to see the structure of things that are normally too small to see properly or to see at all, for example, a model of an insect or of a molecule.

A physical model of an animal shows the animals physical composition without it walking or flying away, and without danger, and if the real animal is not available. A soft model of an animal is popular among children and some adults as cuddly toy.

A model of a person may e.g. be a doll, a statue, and in fiction a robotic humanoid, e.g. the mechas in the movie A.I..

A model is a 3D alternative for a 2D representation such as a drawing or photograph, or in the case of a globe, a 3D, undistorted alternative for a flat world map.

Examples
Some of the examples of Physical models:
 Model airplane
 Model car
 Model railway
 Model rocket
 Model house
 Model (art), a person posing for an artist, e.g. a 15th-century criminal representing the biblical Judas in Leonardo da Vinci's painting The Last Supper
 Model (person), a person who serves as a template for others to copy, often in the context of advertising commercial products
 Model (product), a particular design of a product offered by its manufacturer
 Car model, a particular design of vehicle sold by a manufacturer
 Model organism (often shortened to model), a non-human species that is studied to understand biological phenomena present in other related organisms, e.g. a guinea pig starved of vitamin C to study scurvy, an experiment that would be immoral to conduct on a person
 Model (mimicry), a species that is mimicked by another species

Conceptual model
A conceptual model is a theoretical representation of a system, e.g. a set of equations attempting to describe the workings of the atmosphere for the purpose of weather forecasting. Conceptual models may be a representation of a system. It consists of concepts used to help people know, understand, or simulate a subject the model represents. The term may refer to models that are  formed after a conceptualization or generalization process. Conceptual models are often abstractions of things in the real world, whether physical or social. Semantic studies are relevant to various stages of concept formation. Semantics is basically about concepts, the meaning that thinking beings give to various elements of their experience.

Examples
 Conceptual model (computer science), a representation of entities and their relationships
 Mathematical model, a description of a system using mathematical concepts and language
 Economic model, a theoretical construct representing economic processes
 Statistical model, a mathematical model that usually specifies the relationship between one or more random variables and other non-random variables
 Model (CGI), a mathematical representation of any surface of an object in three dimensions via specialized software
 Model (logic), a set along with a collection of finitary operations, and relations that are defined on it, satisfying a given collection of axioms
 Model (MVC), the central component of the model–view–controller software design pattern
 Standard model (disambiguation)
 Medical model, a proposed "set of procedures in which all doctors are trained"
 Model act, a law drafted centrally to be disseminated and proposed for enactment in multiple independent legislatures

See also

Scale model
Mathematical model
Model organism
Model nation
Metamodeling
Scientific model
Wind tunnel

References

External links

Broad-concept articles
Simulation
Concepts
Physical models
Scale modeling
Copying